X3 were a short lived Australian group, consisting of Brianna Nicholls, Fiona Henson and Anna Le.

The debut single "A Girl Like Me" was written by T-Boz from TLC. The song was released in May 2001 and peaked at number 28 on the ARIA Charts.

A studio album was recorded, titled Wanted and was scheduled for release in September 2001, but was not released.

Discography

Singles

References

Musical groups from Sydney
2000 establishments in Australia
2001 disestablishments in Australia
Musical groups established in 2000
Musical groups disestablished in 2001